Herføl is a sparsely populated, wooded island in the municipality of Hvaler in Østfold,  Norway. The island has an area of  1,9 km² and is designated with postal code 1690.

See also
Ytre Hvaler National Park

References

Hvaler
Islands of Viken (county)